The Admirable Crichton is a comic stage play written in 1902 by J. M. Barrie.

Origins
Barrie took the title from the sobriquet of a fellow Scot, the polymath James Crichton, a 16th-century genius and athlete. The epigram-loving Ernest is probably a caricature of the title character in Oscar Wilde's The Importance of Being Earnest. The plot may derive from Robinson's Eiland, an 1896 German play by Ludwig Fulda. In this, "a satire upon modern super-culture in its relation to primal nature", a group of Berlin officials (including a capitalist, a professor and a journalist) are shipwrecked on an island, where a secretary, Arnold, becomes the natural leader of the group. The contemporary critic Arthur Bingham Walkley, however, viewed the connection as merely a rumour: "I feel quite indifferent as to its accuracy of fact".

Characters

Synopsis

Act One 
Act one is set in Loam Hall, the household of the Earl of Loam, a British peer, with Crichton being his butler. Loam considers the class divisions in British society to be artificial. He promotes his views during tea parties, where servants mingle with his aristocratic guests, to the embarrassment of all. Crichton particularly disapproves, considering the class system to be "the natural outcome of a civilised society".

Act Two 
Loam, his family and friends, and Crichton are shipwrecked on a deserted tropical island. The resourceful Crichton is the only one of the party with any practical knowledge, and he assumes, initially with reluctance, the position of leader. This role begins to take on sinister tones when he starts training Ernest, one of the young aristocrats with them, to break a liking for laboured epigrams by putting his head in a bucket of water whenever he makes one. Crichton's social betters at first resist his growing influence and go their separate ways, but in a pivotal scene they return, showing their acquiescence by accepting the food Crichton alone has been able to find and cook.

Act Three 
In act three, the play has advanced two years. Crichton has civilised the island with farming and house building and now, called "the Guv.", is waited on with the trappings and privileges of power, just as his master had been in Britain. Lady Mary, Loam's daughter, falls in love with him, forgetting her engagement to Lord Brocklehurst at home. Just as she and Crichton are about to be married by a clergyman who was shipwrecked with them, the sound of a ship's gun is heard. After a moment's temptation not to reveal their whereabouts, Crichton makes the conventionally decent choice and launches a signal. As the rescuers greet the castaways, he resumes his status as butler.

Act Four 
Subtitled "The Other Island", the final act is set back at Loam Hall, where the status quo ante has returned uneasily. The Loams and their friends are embarrassed by Crichton's presence, since Ernest has published a false account of events on the island, presenting himself and Lord Loam in key roles. Lady Brocklehurst, Lord Brocklehurst's mother, quizzes the family and servants about events on the island, suspecting that Lady Mary might have been unfaithful to Lord Brocklehurst. The household evades these questions, except for a final one when Lady Mary reacts with shock – "Oh no, impossible..." – to the suggestion that Crichton might become butler at her married household. To protect her, Crichton explains the impossibility is due to his leaving service, and the play ends with his and Lady Mary's regretful final parting.

Analysis
The play deals with serious class issues that were controversial at the time. Barrie had considered a more controversial resolution – particularly an upbeat ending with Crichton and Lady Mary continuing their relationship – but decided "the stalls wouldn't stand it".

Productions

It was produced by Charles Frohman and opened at the Duke of York's Theatre in London on 4 November 1902, running for an extremely successful 828 performances. It starred H. B. Irving as Crichton and Irene Vanbrugh as Lady Mary Lasenby.

In 1903, the play was produced on Broadway by Frohman, starring William Gillette as Crichton and Sybil Carlisle as Lady Mary. In Summer 1932, a Royal Command Performance of the play was held in Edinburgh.

George C. Tyler revived it at the New Amsterdam Theatre in New York in 1931 starring Walter Hampden as Crichton, Hubert Bruce at the Earl of Loam and Fay Bainter as Lady Mary Lasenby.

The play was staged by the Edinburgh Gateway Company in 1957.<ref>Edinburgh Gateway Company (1965), The Twelve Seasons of the Edinburgh Gateway Company, 1953 - 1965, The St. Giles Press, Edinburgh, p. 47</ref>

In 1985 the play was staged at the Royal Exchange, Manchester with Hugh Quarshie as Crichton, Janet McTeer as Lady Mary Lasenby, Amanda Donohoe as Lady Catherine Lasenby and  Avril Elgar as Mrs Perkins.

The play was revived in London in 1989 with Edward Fox as Crichton, and the newly knighted Rex Harrison as Lord Loam. Harrison's mentor Gerald du Maurier played the nephew in the original production.

In other media

Television versions
There have been two television version of the play. The first BBC production was performed live twice in 1950, and was not recorded. The second was a 1968 American TV movie.

Radio adaptations
In 2011, it was adapted as a Saturday Play for BBC Radio 4, starring Russell Tovey as Crichton.

A spoof version was made for series 3 of Round the Horne. It was called " The Admirable Loombucket", with Kenneth Williams in the Crichton role.

Film adaptations
A 1918 film was directed by G. B. Samuelson. A 1957 film starred Kenneth More, Sally Ann Howes, and Cecil Parker.

Indirect adaptations
The play was also filmed in less faithful forms: 
 1919 Cecil B. De Mille silent, Male and Female 1933 French film, Charlemagne 1934 Bing Crosby vehicle, We're Not Dressing 
 1936 Chinese film, Back to Nature, written and directed by Sun Yu
 2023 The Triangle of Sadness

Cultural impact
 Basil Fawlty refers to Manuel as "the admirable Crichton" in the Fawlty Towers episode "The Germans".
 Crichton formed the basis for Kryten as the name for the mechanoid servant in the British science fiction television series Red Dwarf.
There may also be an echo of the class power shift in Lina Wertmuller's 1974 movie "Swept Away".

References

External links

The Admirable Crichton text with illustrations at Peterphile.info
The Admirable Crichton illustrated review from  The Play Pictorial'' No. XI (1903).
List of longest running plays in London and New York
The Admirable Crichton BBC Radio 4 version
 

Plays by J. M. Barrie
1902 plays
British plays adapted into films
West End plays